Jorge Arias may refer to:

 Sin Cara (Jose Jorge Arriaga Rodriguez, born 1977), Mexican-American professional wrestler 
 Jorge Arias (swimmer) (born 1972), Peruvian swimmer
 Jorge Enrique Arias (born 1992), Colombian footballer